Gahnia filifolia is a tussock-forming perennial in the family Cyperaceae, that is native to central parts of New South Wales.

References

filifolia
Plants described in 1940
Flora of New South Wales